= Critical Defiance =

Chilean metal band

Critical Defiance is a Chilean thrash metal band. They released four albums, among others through Dying Victims Productions.

== Discography ==
- Misconception (2019)
- No Life Forms (2022)
- The Search Won't Fall... (2024)
- Rivers of Blood (2026)

== External link ==
- Entry at Metal Storm

=== Further reading ===
- Review of Misconception by Metal Temple
- Review of Misconception by Angry Metal Guy
- Review of Misconception by Hellfire-Magazin (in German)
- Review of No Life Forms by Metal Temple
- Review of No Life Forms by Frenzy Fire
- Review of No Life Forms by The Dark Melody (in Spanish)
- Review of No Life Forms by Metallized.it (in Italian)
- Review of The Search Won't Fall... by Metal Temple
- Review of The Search Won't Fall... by Mystification Zine
- Review of The Search Won't Fall... by Frenzy Fire
- Review of The Search Won't Fall... by Metal Bite
- Review of The Search Won't Fall... by Hellfire-Magazin (in German)
- Review of The Search Won't Fall... by FFM-Rock (in German)
- Review of The Search Won't Fall... by Crossfire-Metal (in German)
- Review of The Search Won't Fall... by Metallized.it (in Italian)
- Review of Rivers of Blood by Angry Metal Guy
- Review of Rivers of Blood by Mystification Zine
- Review of Rivers of Blood by Metal Bite
- Review of Rivers of Blood by Hellfire-Magazin (in German)
- Review of Rivers of Blood by FFM-Rock (in German)
- Review of Rivers of Blood by Crossfire-Metal (in German)
- Review of Rivers of Blood by The Dark Melody (in Spanish)
- Review of Rivers of Blood by Metallized.it (in Italian)
